Aleksandr Kletskov (born 27 September 1985) is an Uzbekistani international football defender who most recently played for Shukura Kobuleti.

Career
Kletskov began his playing career with Pakhtakor and has appeared for the club in several editions of the AFC Champions League. He also has played for Jiangsu Sainty and Tianjin Teda in the Chinese Super League.

On 13 July 2013 he joined Turkish club Orduspor, signing one year long agreement with club, but later transfer was canceled. In 2014 Kletskov played for Neftchi Farg'ona.

Honours
Pakhtakor
 Uzbek League (3): 2005, 2006, 2007
 Uzbek Cup (4):  2005, 2006, 2007, 2009
 CIS cup: 2007

References

External links

1985 births
Living people
People from Mary, Turkmenistan
Uzbekistani footballers
Uzbekistan international footballers
Pakhtakor Tashkent FK players
Jiangsu F.C. players
Tianjin Jinmen Tiger F.C. players
Expatriate footballers in China
Uzbekistani expatriate sportspeople in China
Chinese Super League players
FK Dinamo Samarqand players
Footballers at the 2006 Asian Games
Association football defenders
Asian Games competitors for Uzbekistan